Presidential elections were held in Croatia for the first time on 2 August 1992 alongside simultaneous parliamentary elections. The result was a victory for incumbent Franjo Tuđman of the Croatian Democratic Union (HDZ), who received 57.8% of the vote, becoming the first popularly elected president of Croatia. Voter turnout was 74.9%.

The 1,519,000 votes received by Tuđman remains the highest number of votes won by any president to date. Having previously been selected as president by Parliament, he was sworn in for his first constitutional five-year term as president on 12 August 1992 at Saint Mark's square in Zagreb.

Conduct
The elections were criticised by international observers, who noted several problems, including issues with opposition access to state media, the timing of the election and the impartiality of officials. The timing was deemed to be favourable to the HDZ government, who had delayed approving electoral laws in violation of the country's new constitution. The period of time between the announcement of the elections and the election date itself was considered "unusually short", making it difficult for opposition parties and election officials to prepare. The elections were also scheduled for a holiday, when a significant number of people would be away from their home towns and unable to vote.

Results

References

 
Croatia
Presidential
August 1992 events in Europe
Presidential elections in Croatia
Modern history of Croatia
Franjo Tuđman